The Second cabinet of Louis Mathieu Molé was announced on 15 April 1837 by King Louis Philippe I.
It replaced the First cabinet of Louis Mathieu Molé.

The Chamber of Deputies was dissolved and new elections held on 2 March 1839. The results were not favorable to the government.
The members of the cabinet resigned on 8 March 1839.
The ministry was replaced on 31 March 1839 by the Transitional cabinet of 1839.

Ministers

The cabinet was created by ordinance of 15 April 1837. The ministers were:
 President of the Council: Louis-Mathieu Molé
 Foreign Affairs: Louis-Mathieu Molé
 Interior: Camille de Montalivet
 Justice and Religious Affairs: 
 Félix Barthe (Minister)
 Narcisse Parant (Sub-secretary of State from 21 May 1837)
 War: Simon Bernard
 Finance: Jean Lacave-Laplagne
 Navy and Colonies: Claude du Campe de Rosamel
 Public Education: Narcisse-Achille de Salvandy
 Public Works, Agriculture and Commerce: Nicolas Martin du Nord

References
Citations

Sources

French governments
1837 establishments in France
1839 disestablishments in France
Cabinets established in 1837
Cabinets disestablished in 1839